Highway 298 (AR 298, Ark. 298, and Hwy. 298) is a designation for three state highways in Lower Arkansas. The eastern segment of  begins at Sims at Highway 88 and runs southeast to US Route 270 (US 270). A middle segment of  runs from Highway 27 at Story east to Highway 7. A segment in Saline County of  runs east from Highway 9 to Highway 5 near Benton.

Route description

Sims to Highway 270
The route begins at a junction with Arkansas Highway 88 at Sims and runs southeast to US 270. This segment does not cross or concur with any other state highways.

Story to Highway 7
The route begins at Arkansas Highway 27 at Story, Arkansas in Montgomery County and runs east through the Ouachita National Forest for almost its entire length. Highway 298 passes through very wooded area with sparse populations, crossing over many feeder streams for Lake Ouachita. The highway ends at a junction with Arkansas Highway 7 north of Hot Springs.

Saline County

Major intersections

|-
| colspan=5 align=center| Highway 298 begins in Story
|-

|-
| align=center colspan=6 | Highway 298 begins at Highway 5
|-

See also

 List of state highways in Arkansas

References

External links

298
Transportation in Montgomery County, Arkansas
Transportation in Garland County, Arkansas
Transportation in Saline County, Arkansas